The SPD Bavaria (SPD Bayern, own spelling BayernSPD, full name Sozialdemokratische Partei Deutschlands (SPD), Landesverband Bayern, Social Democratic Party of Germany (SPD), State Association of Bavaria) is the Bavarian State Association of the Social Democratic Party of Germany. In February 2018, it was the second largest state association of a party in Bavaria with 62,122 members.

The party's co-chairs are Ronja Endres and Florian von Brunn.

History
The SPD Bavaria has a rich history, which dates back to 1866, when a workers' education club in Nuremberg was founded as the first Social Democratic institution. In 1881, Karl Grillenberger won the first Reichstag mandate for the SPD in Bavaria, also in Nuremberg. 1887 the SPD (still not under this name) in the Kingdom of Bavaria joined for the first time the election to the Chamber of Deputies of the Kingdom, and received 2.1 percent of the vote, but no seat. In 1888, the Social Democratic newspaper of Münchener Post was founded.

The history of the SPD Bayern as a separate organization began with the first party conference of the SPD in Bavaria, which met on the initiative of Georg von Vollmar in 1892 in Reinhausen near Regensburg. The party congress decided that the SPD would take part in the state elections in 1893 and passed an election program.

Chairpeople

Election results

Landtag of Bavaria

References

Politics of Bavaria
Bavaria
State sections of political parties in Germany